Namulonge Airport, also referred to as Namulonge Airstrip, is an airstrip serving the Namulonge Agronometeorology Station near the town of Namulonge in the Wakiso District of Uganda,  north of central Kampala. The narrow runway is also used as a road and is surrounded by plowed fields of the agricultural research station.

The station has an automated airport weather station (AWOS) system installed. The "HUNA" ICAO airport code may be no longer active.

See also
Transport in Uganda
List of airports in Uganda

References

External links
OpenStreetMap - Namulonge

Airports in Uganda
Wakiso District